Papineau (formerly Papineau—Saint-Denis and Papineau—Saint-Michel) is a federal electoral district in Montreal, Quebec, Canada, that has been represented in the House of Commons of Canada since 1948. Its population in 2016 was 110,750. Justin Trudeau, the Prime Minister of Canada and Leader of the Liberal Party, has represented the riding since the 2008 federal election. Trudeau became Liberal leader in a 2013 leadership election, succeeding Bob Rae, and prime minister when the Liberals returned to government in the 2015 Canadian federal election, succeeding Conservative leader Stephen Harper.

The name of the riding comes from a street in the Villeray neighbourhood, named after Joseph Papineau.

At nine square kilometres, it covers the second smallest area of any federal riding in Canada after Toronto Centre. Linguistically, 45% of residents list French as their mother tongue, 8% list English, and 47% list neither English nor French, with large groups speaking Spanish, Italian, Urdu, Hindi, Punjabi, Pashtu, Bengali, Greek, and Arabic. Immigrants make up 40 percent of the riding's population.

Geography
The district includes the neighbourhoods of Villeray and Park Extension, as well as the southern part of the old city of Saint-Michel in the Borough of Villeray–Saint-Michel–Parc-Extension.
The southeast corner of the riding borders the Outremont riding, which was most recently held by Tom Mulcair, the former leader of the New Democratic Party.

Political geography
Papineau, despite its small size, is a very divided riding. The riding spans the former linguistic divide of the city, Saint Laurent Boulevard. South of the riding is the neighbourhood of Park Extension, which is very Liberal. The central part of the riding, around Villeray, was Bloc Québécois territory for almost two decades before swinging heavily to the NDP in the 2011 federal election. Meanwhile, François-Perreault district, in the south of Saint-Michel, is considered swing territory between the Liberals and the NDP. The district of Saint-Michel, which is part of neighbouring Saint-Léonard—Saint-Michel riding to the northeast of Papineau, leans to the Liberals.

Except for the years 2006 to 2008, when it was held by Vivian Barbot of the Bloc, the seat has been in Liberal hands since 1953.

Demographics

According to the Canada 2016 Census
 Twenty most common mother tongue languages (2016) : 49.7% French, 6.6% Spanish, 6.5% English, 5.9% Arabic, 4.2% Greek, 3.4% Italian, 2.7% Vietnamese, 2.4% Creole languages, 2.2% Punjabi, 2.1% Portuguese, 1.8% Bengali, 1.8% Urdu, 1.5% Tamil, 1.1% Cantonese, 1.0% Gujarati, 0.6% Mandarin, 0.6% Kabyle, 0.5% Khmer, 0.5% Turkish, 0.3% Polish, 0.3% Russian

History
The electoral district of Papineau was created in 1947 from parts of the Hochelaga, Mercier, St. James and Saint-Denis ridings.

It was renamed Papineau-Saint-Michel in 1987 and Papineau-Saint-Denis in 1994. It was shortened back to "Papineau" in 2003.

This riding gained territory from Outremont and Saint-Léonard—Saint-Michel during the 2012 electoral redistribution.

Former boundaries

Members of Parliament

This riding has elected the following Members of Parliament:

Election results

Papineau, 2003 – present

Papineau—Saint-Denis, 1996–2003

Papineau—Saint-Michel, 1987–1996

Papineau, 1947–1987

Note: Social Credit vote is compared to Ralliement créditiste vote in the 1968 election.

Note: Ralliement créditiste vote is compared to Social Credit vote in the 1963 election.

Note: NDP vote is compared to CCF vote in 1958 election.

See also

 List of Canadian federal electoral districts
 Past Canadian electoral districts

References

Riding history 1948–1988 from the  Library of Parliament
Riding history 2004–present from the Library of Parliament
2011 Results from Elections Canada
Campaign expense data from Elections Canada

Notes

Federal electoral districts of Montreal
Villeray–Saint-Michel–Parc-Extension
Justin Trudeau
2003 establishments in Quebec